The Head of State of Mexico is the person who controls the executive power in the country. Under the current constitution, this responsibility lies with the President of the United Mexican States, who is head of the supreme executive power of the Mexican Union. Throughout its history, Mexico has had several forms of government. Under the federal constitutions, the title of President was the same as the current one. Under the Seven Laws (centralist), the chief executive was named President of the Republic. In addition, there have been two periods of monarchical rule, during which the executive was controlled by the Emperor of Mexico.

The chronology of the heads of state of Mexico is complicated due to the country's political instability during most of the nineteenth century and early decades of the twentieth century. With few exceptions, most of the Mexican presidents elected during this period did not complete their terms. Until the presidency of Lázaro Cárdenas, each president remained in office an average of fifteen months.

This list also includes the self-appointed presidents during civil wars and the collegiate bodies that performed the Mexican Executive duties during periods of transition.

First Mexican Empire (1821–1823)

First Regency 
After the end of the Mexican War of Independence, a Provisional Board of Governing consisting of thirty-four persons was set up. The Board decreed and signed the Declaration of Independence of the Mexican Empire and appointed a regency composed of six people.

Second Regency

Monarchy of Agustín de Iturbide I

Provisional Government (1823–1824) 

The Provisional Government of 1823–1824 was an organization that served as the Executive in the government of Mexico after the abdication of Agustín I, monarch of  Mexican Empire in 1823. The provisional government was responsible for convening the body that created the Federal Republic and existed from 1 April 1823 to 10 October 1824.

First Federal Republic (1824–1835) 

The president and vice president did not run jointly and could be from different parties.

Centralist Republic (1835–1846)

Second Federal Republic (1846–1863)

Reform War 1858-1860

There were two rival governments during the civil war of the Reform, which the liberals won.

President recognized by the Liberals

Presidents recognized by the Conservatives

Second Mexican Empire (1863–1867)

Regency 
On 22 June 1863, a "Superior Governing Board" was established. On 11 July, the Board became the Regency of the Empire.

Monarchy of Maximilian I

Restored Republic (1867–1876)

Porfiriato (1876–1911)

Revolution (1911–1928) 

 Political parties

Presidents recognized by the Convention of Aguascalientes 

The Conventionists were followers of revolutionary generals Pancho Villa and Emiliano Zapata. They fought a civil war with the followers of revolutionaries under Venustiano Carranza.

Constitutionalist victory and restoration of democracy 
The revolutionary Constitutionalist Army under the authority "First Chief" Venustiano Carranza defeated the Army of the Convention in 1915, with a new constitution drafted in 1916-17.

 Political parties

Maximato (1928–1934) 

President-elect Obregón was assassinated before he was inaugurated for a six-year presidential term.  Calles brought together revolutionaries to found a political party.  Calles could not succeed himself as president, but he remained the power behind the presidency as the jefe máximo (maximum chief).

 Political parties

Modern Mexico (1934–present) 

After the constitutional reform of 1926, the presidential term in Mexico was extended to six years starting in 1928; with a formal ban on reelection. After the 1934 general election, all the presidents have completed their six-year terms.

 Political parties

Presidents who died in office

Timeline

See also
President of Mexico
Emperor of Mexico
First Lady of Mexico
Politics of Mexico
History of Mexico
Aztec Empire
Tenochtitlan
List of Tenochtitlan rulers
New Spain
List of viceroys of New Spain

References

External links
 Lista de gobernantes de México Official List

Mexico, List of heads of state of
List
Presidents
Mexico